Baratham Paadiya Perundevanar (Tamil: பாரதம் பாடிய பெருந்தேவனார்) was a Medieval Tamil poet of the 9th century CE. He was the author of Bharatha Venba, a 12,000-verse Tamil work on the epic of Mahabharata. He also penned verse 30 of the Tiruvalluva Maalai.

Of the 12,000 verses of the Bharatha Venba, only about 830 remains. Of these 818 were published in 1925 by A. Gopala Iyer. To differentiate Perundevanar from his namesake Sangam poet, he came to be known by the name 'Baratham Paadiya Perundevanar' (Perundevanar who sang Mahabharata). He has reportedly added a God-invoking verse to all the works in Ettuthogai (the Eight anthologies) of the Sangam literature and hence has been credited with compiling those works.

See also

 Sangam literature
 List of Sangam poets
 Tiruvalluva Maalai

Notes

Tamil philosophy
Tamil poets
Scholars from Tamil Nadu
Tiruvalluva Maalai contributors